

Buildings and structures

Buildings
 1021 – Church of the Quedlinburg Abbey, Holy Roman Empire built (begun c. 997).
 1022 – Monastery of Sant Pere de Rodes, Catalonia consecrated.
 About 1023
 Romanesque church at Mont Saint-Michel off the Normandy coast founded.
 Construction of Church of St Philibert, Tournus in Burgundy begun.
 About 1025 – City of Gangaikonda Cholapuram founded as a capital of the Chola Empire.
 1026 – Pomposa Abbey near Ferrara, Italy completed (except the campanile finished in 1063).
 1029 – Construction of Sant Vicenç de Cardonia, Catalonia begun.

References

11th-century architecture
Architecture